Gulliver's World is a theme park located in Warrington, England. It consists of the themed areas Land, Gully Town, and Safari Kingdom. The park's attractions were designed for children between the ages of 2 and 13. Splash Zone and Blast Arena are two indoor attractions located next to the 
main theme park. A hotel opened on the site in 2012.

Gulliver's World has sister parks at Matlock Bath (Gulliver's Kingdom), Milton Keynes (Gulliver's Land) and Rotherham (Gulliver’s Valley).

History 
Gulliver's World was opened in 1989 and is the second Gulliver's theme park to be built in the UK, with the first being Gulliver's Kingdom located in Matlock Bath. The park has expanded since then with additional attractions, bigger rides and with the opening of The Gulliver's Hotel to provide short breaks. Gulliver's have focused specifically on families with younger children across their four theme parks.

Significant rides at the park include The Antelope, Desperado drop and Apache Falls. Play areas are provided both indoors and outdoors for younger children.

Incidents

On 13 July 2002, a 15-year-old girl with Down syndrome fell  from a Ferris wheel. She was taken to hospital, and died two days later from her injuries. The park were fined a total of £80,000 for failing to ensure a person's safety, and not carrying out risk assessments.

On 15 September 2018, The Crazy Train rollercoaster broke down after 2 wheels fell off during the ride, leaving 21 people trapped on the ride 50 feet above the ground for three hours.  No one was injured.

Rides and attractions
Gulliver's World has many rides.

Roller Coasters

Water Rides

Tracked Rides

Flat/Other Rides

Former

The Gulliver's Hotel Warrington 
Opened in 2012, the Gulliver's Hotel forms part of Gulliver's World Resort. Accommodation is primarily designed for families, with relevant facilities and attractions nearby. Accommodation types include:
 Themed Family Suites 
 Executive Suites
 Accessible Accommodation 
 Interconnecting rooms 
Themed rooms include the Swizzels Sweetie Suite and NERF Zone Suite. 
Designed around a woodland theme, selected suites have a balcony area and all have en-suite facilities.

Splash Zone 
Gulliver's World has expanded to include additional indoor attractions that are available throughout the year. Splash Zone is their first major indoor venue on the site, consisting of multiple water based features such as slides and sprays. There are sessions on selected term time dates that are just for pre-school children. These 'Splash Tots' sessions have been introduced in recent years due to the high demand from parents with toddlers.

In summer 2017 Splash Zone was relaunched with 6 additional waterslides.

Blast Arena 
Designed for children aged 6 and over, this indoor attraction has been a popular choice for birthday parties and group visits in Warrington. The Blast Arena provides participants with a chance to gain experience in the target range and then enter the main NERF Arena. NERF Blasters, goggles and target vest are provided for each session. There are two more NERF Zone venues operated by Gulliver's Theme Parks, they are located at Gulliver's Land Resort and Gulliver's Kingdom Resort.

RAF Burtonwood Heritage Centre  
The Gulliver's World site was once part of the RAF Burtonwood air base. The official RAF Burtonwood Heritage Centre was established and built on the theme park so that visitors could explore the history of the site in further detail. The centre features various collections including RAF memorabilia alongside numerous displays.

References

External links

Official Website

Amusement parks in England
Tourist attractions in Warrington